There are currently 97 pitchers and 32 records in the sub-0.86 WHIP club: 
 Note every player on the list played four seasons (except those currently with one year eligibility remaining) totaling at least 700 innings pitched.

Progression
Virginia Augusta ended her career pitching a win vs. the Akron Zips. She was one of the earliest NCAA Division I pitchers to accomplish a sub-0.86 WHIP for a four-year career. She surpassed the career WHIP record held by Stacey Johnson, who had passed the record originally set by Debbie Doom in consecutive years from 1985-87. From the list, Brenda Bixby, Debby Day, Christy Larsen and Angie Lear were the first to pitch their entire careers from 43 ft., whereas all others prior to the 1988 season pitched from 40 ft. distance to the mound.

Records & Milestones
Courtney Blades won the most games with an NCAA record 52 and 0.67 WHIP in 2000. As a sophomore in 1988, Debbie Nichols tossed another NCAA all-time and Sophomore Class record 36 shutouts, producing an 0.59 WHIP. Rhonda Wheatly pitched the all-time and Sophomore Class record 434.1 innings and had an 0.60 WHIP. The most career innings thrown by a pitcher on the list is Monica Abbott's NCAA record 1448.0; Cassidy Scoggins pitched 707.2 for her career, the minimal innings of any pitcher on the list.

Virginia Augusta (0.36 in 1986 and 0.46 in 1987), Shawn Andaya (0.39 in 1985 and 0.48 in 1986), Cat Osterman (0.42 in 2006, 0.43 in 2005 and 0.46 in 2003), Trinity Johnson (0.43 in 1997), Christy Larsen (0.44 in 1990), Amy Unterbrink (0.47 in 1986), Danielle Henderson (0.48 in 1999), Debbie Doom (0.49 in 1984) and Sarah Pauly (0.49 in 2005) rank in the top-10 for an NCAA season in WHIP. Additionally, along with Augusta’s 1986-87 WHIP, Andaya in 1985, Johnson in 1997, Larsen in 1990, Henderson in 1999, Osterman 2003, 2005–06, Stacey Johnson (0.51 in 1983), Debbie Nichols (0.60 in 1988), Stefni Whitton (0.52 in 1989), Cheryl Longeway (0.61 in 1995), Desarie Knipfer (0.54 in 1998), Amanda Scott (0.57 in 2000), Britni Sneed (0.61 in 2001), Osterman, Jamie Southern and Keira Goerl (0.63 in 2002), Pauly (0.62 in 2004), Abbott (0.56 in 2007), Angela Tincher (0.60 in 2008), Danielle Lawrie (0.68 in 2009), Jen Mineau (0.64 in 2010 and 0.69 in 2011), Olivia Galati (0.66 in 2012), Cheridan Hawkins (0.69 in 2013), Kylee Hansen (0.63 in 2016), Kelly Barnhill (0.61 in 2017) and Megan Beaubien (0.68 in 2018) were tops for those NCAA seasons.

Finally, along with Lawrie in 2009, Doom (0.65, 0.49 and 0.56 WHIP in 1982 and 1984–85), Susan LeFebvre (0.58 in 1986), Shawn Andaya (0.62 in 1987), Lisa Longaker (0.64, 0.58 and 0.56 in 1988-90), Tiffany Boyd (0.57 in 1989), Debby Day (0.64 in 1991), Susie Parra (0.71, 0.68 and 0.99 in 1991, 1993–94), Scott (0.83 in 1998), Freed (0.88 in 1999), Jennie Finch (0.71 in 2001), Jocelyn Forest (0.77 in 2002), Keira Goerl (0.74 and 0.81 in 2003–04), Jennie Ritter (0.62 in 2005) and Alicia Hollowell (0.68 in 2006), Katie Burkhart (0.61 in 2008), Keilani Ricketts (0.78 in 2013), Kylee Hanson (0.76 in 2018), Megan Faraimo (0.84 in 2019) and Rachel Garcia (0.79 in 2019) all won NCAA National Championships those years. For their careers, Osterman (Big 12), Lisa Ishikawa (Big 10), Sarah Pauly (Big South), Abbott (SEC), Jamie Southern (WAC), Angela Tincher (ACC), Terri Whitmarsh (MVC), Sarah Dawson (Southland), Johnston (MAC), Galati (CAA), Danielle Henderson (A-10), Lindsay Chouinard (Summit), Courtney Blades (USA in two seasons with a 0.71 WHIP), Nicole Myers (A-Sun), Brooke Mitchell (Sun Belt) and Bonnie Bynum (OVC) all hold their conference crowns for walks plus hits per innings pitched.

References

External links
 NCAA Division I softball career wins list
 NCAA Division I softball career strikeouts list

College softball in the United States lists